Andra Willis (born August 27, 1943) is an American singer best known from television's The Lawrence Welk Show from 1967 to 1969.

Born and raised in Danville, Virginia. Andra began singing professionally with her sisters Toneda and Sheryl. Billed as the Willis Sisters, they started out locally with bands such as the Freddie Lee Orchestra and later guest starred on national television programs such as The Tonight Show and ironically, on Lawrence Welk's The Plymouth Show. Later, when the Willis Sisters split up, Andra became a solo vocalist, and was a frequent regular on Don McNeill's radio program, The Breakfast Club.

She joined the cast of the Welk show in late 1967, and until her departure in 1969, was featured as both a soloist and in duets with fellow Music Maker Dick Dale.

Since leaving the Welk organization, Andra has pursued a career as a studio session singer and a songwriter. She has worked on the soundtrack for the movie Lost Horizon where she supplied the vocals for Olivia Hussey in the songs Share The Joy and The Things I Will Not Miss .

Today, since the late 1980s, Andra and her husband, musician and composer Larry Muhoberac make their home in Australia.

References

External links
 The Andra Willis Roadside Attraction
 The Lawrence Well Show on IMDb

1943 births
Living people
People from Danville, Virginia
American women singers
Lawrence Welk